František Slavík (25 September 1888 – 2 October 1926) was a Czech long-distance runner. He competed for Bohemia in the marathon at the 1912 Summer Olympics.

References

1888 births
1926 deaths
Athletes (track and field) at the 1912 Summer Olympics
Czech male long-distance runners
Czech male marathon runners
Olympic athletes of Bohemia
Athletes from Prague